The 33rd Trampoline Gymnastics World Championships were held in Saint Petersburg, Russia, from November 7–10, 2018.

Medal table

Medallists

Results

Mixed Team All-around

Qualification

Final

References

External links
 FIG site

 Trampoline Gymnastics World Championships
2018 in Russian sport
Trampoline Gymnastics World Championships
International gymnastics competitions hosted by Russia
Trampoline Gymnastics World Championships
Sports competitions in Saint Petersburg
2018